is a Japanese Magic: The Gathering player. He is best known for his success in the 2006 Pro Tour season, when he won Pro Tour Charleston with Tomohiro Kaji and Tomoharu Saitou, as well as the Player of the Year title. In 2015, Yasooka was elected into the Magic: The Gathering Hall of Fame.

When the Magic Online Player of the Year award was introduced in 2009, Yasooka with his account "yaya3" became the first player to win this honour. He also won the 2009 Magic Online Champion – Sealed title.  

Yasooka is currently the lead card designer for the Final Fantasy Trading Card Game.

Career 
Yasooka's Pro Tour career began in 2001 at Pro Tour Barcelona. It would be three years until he played his second Pro Tour in 2004 in Kobe. The following season, he put up two more unimpressive Pro Tour finishes in Nagoya, and Atlanta, before finishing in the top sixteen at that year's World Championship. This finish qualified him for Pro Tour Honolulu, and served as a catalyst for a spectacular run the following season.

After another solid finish in Honolulu, Yasooka first came into the spotlight at Grand Prix Hamamatsu. Along with Akira Asahara and Masaya Kitayama, he finished in second at the team event. To follow up on this finish, Yasooka made the top eight individually at the next premier event held in Asia, Grand Prix Kuala Lumpur. Just a week later, Yasooka put up the best finish of his Pro Tour career at Pro Tour Charleston with Tomoharu Saitou, and Tomohiro Kaji. Despite losing his finals match to Willy Edel, Yasooka's team, Kajiharu80, still won the event. At this event, his teammates accurately predicted that he would win the Player of the Year title that season. The latter half of the season took Yasooka all over the world. He added three more Grand Prix top eights to his resume, in Sydney, Toulouse, and New Jersey, before the end of the season. Going into the World Championship, Yasooka had the lead in the Player of the Year race, and despite earning only the minimum two Pro Points there, no one was able to pass him.  As a result, Yasooka became the 2006 Player of the Year with a total of 60 Pro Points.  Yasooka became the second of five Japanese players to win the Player of the Year title in a row, preceded by Kenji Tsumura and followed by Tomoharu Saito, Shuhei Nakamura and Yuuya Watanabe.  This has been referred to as the 'golden age' of Magic in Japan.

Since then, Yasooka has continued to play on the Pro Tour, but without the same degree of success of the 2006 season. He top-eighted three more Grand Prix, Strasbourg, Montreal, and Kitakyushu, in the 2007 season, and Grand Prix Manila in 2008, but did not return to the top eight of a Pro Tour until 2015.

In 2009, Yasooka would be invited to play in the first Magic Online World Championship as a result of becoming Magic Online Player of the Year.  The event took place at the same time as the 2009 World Championship.  Yasooka would reach the finals of the tournament but ultimately lost to Anssi Myllymäki.

In 2010, Yasooka made the Top 8 of two Grand Prix and the Japanese National Championship.  Yasooka's 35 Pro points placed him in 21st place in the 2010 Pro Tour Player of the Year standings.

In 2011, made the Top 8 of three Grand Prix events and the Japanese National Championship.  Yasooka gained 52 Pro points through the season, placing him in joint seventh place in the 2011 Pro Tour Player of the Year standings, alongside Yuuya Watanabe and Josh Utter-Leyton.

At the end of the 2012 season, Yasooka had amassed 53 Pro Points, which was enough to secure himself a place in the first ever Magic Players Championship.  Yasooka's 53 pro points placed him seventh in the overall Pro Players Club standings for the second season in a row.

Shouta Yasooka won his second pro tour in the Pro Tour season 2016-17, Pro Tour Kaladesh in Honolulu using Grixis control.

Achievements

Top 8 appearances 

Other accomplishments

 Pro Tour Player of the Year 2006
 Magic Online Player of the Year 2009
 2009 Magic Online Champion – Sealed
 Magic: The Gathering Hall of Fame class of 2015

Reputation 
Shouta Yasooka is widely regarded as being a talented deck-builder. He is known to favor blue-based control decks, and decks designed by him are sometimes referred to as 'Yaso-Control' or 'Yaso-Con' decks. Yasooka is also known for his fast and technical play style, an aspect of his game that is considered particularly impressive given his preference for control decks requiring much decision-making. In January 2012, Paulo Vitor Damo da Rosa named Yasooka as the main player he would most like to add to Team ChannelFireball. Paulo stated "...he always comes up with the craziest deck ideas and they all seem very bad, but he always does well and is insanely good, so I would like to see how he thinks".

In an episode of Magic TV aired in 2012, Luis Scott-Vargas listed Yasooka eighth in the Top 8 players he least wants to play against in tournament play. He explained that he believed that Yasooka is one of the most underrated players in professional Magic, and could make it into the Magic: The Gathering Hall of Fame if it were not for his lack of Pro Tour Top 8s. He was eventually elected into the Hall of Fame at the end of 2015 season, during which he had posted his second Pro Tour top 8 appearance, at Pro Tour Dragons of Tarkir in Brussels.

References

Living people
Japanese Magic: The Gathering players
People from Tokyo
1984 births